The 2000–01 Turkish Basketball League was the 35th season of the top-tier professional basketball league in Turkey. The season started on October 14, 2010. Ülkerspor won their third national championship this season.

Regular season

League table

Turkish Basketball League 2001/2002 play-offs

as of June 4, 2002

The 2002 Beko Basketball League play-offs is the final phase of the 2001–2002 regular season.

First round, Quarterfinal and Semifinal series are 5-match series. The teams reaches the first 3 wins is through to the next round.  The team which has won both regular season matchups starts with a 1–0 lead to the series. If teams split up the regular season meetings, series starts with a 1–1 draw.

Final series are 7-match series and the team reaches first 4 wins is the champion of the Turkish Basketball League.

External links
 Turkish Basketball League Official Website
 Turkish Basketball Federation Official Website
 TBLStat.net League History, 2000-01 Season 

Turkish Basketball Super League seasons
Turkish
1